Flack may refer to:

Flack (TV series), a 2019 American-British TV series
Flack, Virginia, the former name of Waynesboro 
Flack (or Flak), an informal term for a publicity manager
Flacking, a self-coined term for the art created by Ememem

People with the surname
Audrey Flack (born 1931), American painter and sculptor
Caroline Flack (1979–2020), British television presenter
Doug Flack (1920–2005), English footballer
Edwin Flack (1873–1935), Australian Olympic athlete in track and field and tennis
Hertha E. Flack (1916–2019), American philanthropist and painter
Hugh Flack (born 1903), Irish footballer
John Flack (bishop) (born 1942), British bishop of the Anglican Church
John Flack (British politician) (born 1957), British Conservative politician
Karen Flack, American mechanical engineer
Layne Flack (1969–2021), American professional poker player
Marjorie Flack (1897–1958), American author of children's books
Max Flack (1890–1975), American professional baseball player
Roberta Flack (born 1937), American jazz and soul singer
Sophie Flack (born 1983), American ballerina
Steve Flack (born 1971), English professional football player
William H. Flack (1861–1907), American politician from New York; U.S. representative 1903–07

Characters
Donald Flack Jr., character on the American television series CSI: NY
George Flack, a newspaper correspondent in Henry James' novel The Reverberator

See also
 
 Flak (disambiguation)
 Fleck, a surname